The following squads and players competed in the World Women's Handball Championship in 2001 in Italy.

Angola 

 Justina Jose Joaquim Lopez Praca
 Maria Tavares
 Felisbela Trinidade 
 Maria Teresa Neto Joaquim 
 Elisa Webba-Torres 
 Ilda Maria Bengue 
 Marcelina Kiala 
 Domingas Cordeiro
 Ivone Mufuca 
 Francisco Conceicao 
 Elzira De Fatima Borges Tavares
 Rosa Do Amaral
 Maria Goncalves
 Teresa Ulundo
 Nair Felipe Pires De Almeida

Austria 

 Nataliya Rusnatchenko
 Beate Hofmann
 Sylvia Strass 
 Birgit Engl 
 Rima Sypkuviene-Sypkus 
 Stephanie Ofenböck 
 Sorina Teodorovic
 Ausra Fridrikas
 Edith Mika
 Laura Fritz 
 Katrin Engel 
 Dagmar Müller
 Alexandra Materzok
 Ariane Maier
 Barbara Strass

Brazil 

 Darly Zoqbi de Paula
 Margarida Conte
 Chana Franciela Masson de Souza 
 Ana Maria Silva 
 Maria José Sales 
 Celia Costa 
 Ariana Roese
 Silvia Helena Araujo Pinheiro 
 Valeria De Oliveira
 Lucia da Silva
 Aline Silva dos Santos
 Daniela De Oliveira Piedade 
 Alina Waleska Lopes Rosas
 Idalina Borges Mesquita 
 Sandra de Oliveira 
 Katia Souza

China 

 Hai Yun Chen 
 Wei Shi 
 Ge Li Yu
 Chao Zhai 
 Ya Nan Wu 
 Ying Zhao 
 Pei Li Long 
 Yang Li 
 Jie Cai
 Hai Yun Chen
 Hong Xia Zhu
 Wei Wei Li
 Xiao Jiong Wang

Denmark 

 Lene Rantala
 Karin Mortensen
 Rikke Poulsen Schmidt
 Mette Vestergaard
 Ditte Andersen
 Christina Roslyng Hansen
 Mette Melgaard
 Katrine Fruelund 
 Louise Pedersen 
 Pernille Hansen 
 Rikke Hörlykke Jörgensen 
 Lotte Faldborg Kiaerskou 
 Kristine Andersen 
 Heidi Johansen 
 Line Daugaard 
 Maria Josephine Touray

France 

 Valérie Nicolas
 Joanne Dudziak
 Leila Duchemann-Lejeune 
 Raphaelle Tervel 
 Sonia Cendier 
 Stéphanie Cano 
 Myriam Korfanty 
 Stéphanie Ludwig 
 Isabelle Wendling 
 Nodjalem Myaro 
 Myriame Said Mohamed 
 Stéphanie Moreau
 Stéphanie Norval-Tabard
 Nathalie Selambarom
 Seynabou Benga
 Sophie Herbrecht

Greenland

 Kista Isaksen
 Rita Egede
 Ella Grodem 
 Karen Marie Kyed 
 Nada Frank Hansen
 Ivalu Kleist
 Mai Hygum Andersen 
 Arnarissoq Jakobsen
 Bodil Tejg Krunderup
 Kamilla Jensen 
 Laila Skytte
 Marianne Clausen
 Pilnnguaq Magnussen
 Linda Lyberth
 Nivi Heiman 
 Ulla Nielsen

Hungary 

 Katalin Pálinger
 Tímea Sugár
 Andrea Farkas
 Beatrix Balogh
 Beáta Siti
 Gabriella Kindl
 Ágnes Farkas
 Eszter Siti
 Erika Kirsner
 Bojana Radulovics
 Rita Borók
 Anita Kulcsár
 Rita Deli
 Ildikó Pádár
 Krisztina Pigniczki
 Zsuzsanna Pálffy

Italy

 Verena Wolf
 Adele de Santis
 Valeria Muretto
 Daniela Russo
 Martina Pascazio
 Elena Barani 
 Zsuzsanna Csoma 
 Luana Pistelli 
 Elisabetta Trotta 
 Laura Profili 
 Francesca Celotto 
 Michaela Cavenaghi 
 Emanuela Avallone 
 Martina Pascazio
 Natalya Anysenkova 
 Rossana Mangano

Japan 

 Michiko Yamashita
 Mineko Tanaka 
 Kimiko Hida
 Akane Aoto 
 Mami Tanaka
 Mitsuko Kurashi
 Masayo Oishi
 Sachie Sumi
 Emiko Matsunaga
 Reiko Yamashita
 Hirono Yaka
 Hitomi Sakugawa 
 Akiko Kinjo
 Tomoko Sakamoto
 Eiko Yamada 
 Hisayo Taniguchi

Macedonia 

 Oksana Maslova
 Tanja Andrejeva
 Gordana Naceva
 Indira Kastratović
 Dana Filipovska
 Biljana Naumoska
 Dragana Pecevska
 Valentina Radulović
 Biljana Savevska
 Ljubica Georgjievska 
 Biljana Crvenkoska
 Biljana Risteska 
 Mileva Velkova 
 Marija Papudzijeva

Netherlands 

 Joke Nynke Tienstra
 Ingeborg Vlietstra
 Saskia Mulder 
 Olga Anne Maria Assink 
 Natasja Burgers 
 Irina Pusic 
 Elly An de Boer 
 Monique Feijen  
 Ana Razdorov 
 Diane Lamein
 Sylvia Hofman
 Nicole Heuwekemeijer
 Pearl Chantal Van der Wissel
 Diane Ordelmans-Roelofsen

Norway 

 Mimi J. Kopperud Slevigen
 Cecilie Leganger
 Kjersti Grini 
 Heidi Aassveen Halvorsen
 Kristine Lunde
 Kristine Duvholt Havnas 
 Unni Nyhamar Hinkel
 Else-Marthe Sörlie-Lybekk 
 Monica Sandve 
 Gro Hammerseng 
 Janne Tuven 
 Elisabeth Hilmo
 Marianne Rokne 
 Hanne Halen
 Vigdis Haarsaker

Republic of the Congo 

 Patricia Yende
 Lucia Chantal Okonatha
 Clarisse Opondzo
 Ngamabana Menet 
 Ndona Bassarila 
 Chandra Moukila 
 Lèontine Kibamba Nkembo
 Nathalie Ngayilolo
 Rose Angèle Mbokewa 
 Aurelle Itoua Atsono 
 Raissa Bitsere 
 Chantal Okoye Mbon 
 Nadia Loubacky 
 Hawaa Okongo 
 Amèlia Okombi-Moua
 Patricia Mayoulou

Romania 

 Luminita Hutupan Dinu
 Ildiko Kerekes
 Tereza Tamas
 Carmen Liliana Nitescu
 Cristina Dumitrescu
 Simona Silvia Gogirla 
 Alina Nicoleta Dobrin  
 Steluta Luca
 Aurelia Stoica
 Nicoleta Cristina Gisca 
 Carmen Andreea Amariei 
 Luminita Simona Chiriev 
 Florina Mirela Nicolescu
 Carmen Lungu
 Gianina Florii Toncean
 Cristina Varzaru

Russia 

 Tatiana Alizar
 Inna Suslina
 Raisa Verakso
 Natalia Gontcharova
 Svetlana Bogdanova
 Elena Tschauossova 
 Oksana Romenskaya 
 Anna Kareeva 
 Liudmila Bodnieva 
 Nadezda Muravyeva 
 Anna Ignattchenko 
 Tatiana Diadetchko 
 Alina Dolgikh 
 Irina Poltoratskaya
 Irina Prashkova
 Svetlana Smirnova

Slovenia 

 Nada Tutnjic
 Sergeja Stefanisin
 Olga Ceckova 
 Branka Mijatovic 
 Mojca Dercar
 Deja Doler 
 Silvana Ilic 
 Spela Cerar
 Tanja Dajcman
 Vesna Vincic-Pus
 Inna Dolgun 
 Mira Vincic
 Nadija Plesko
 Barbara Gorski
 Tatjana Oder
 Anja Freser

South Korea 

 Nam-Soo Lee
 Kyeong-Ha Moon
 Soon-Young Huh
 Yoon-Jung Lee 
 So-Hee Jang 
 Pil-Hee Moon
 Jung-Young Lee 
 Bok-Hee Myoung
 Sun-Hee Woo 
 Sung-Hee An
 Im-Jeong Choi 
 Ji-Hey Kang
 Eun-Hee Chung
 Myung-Hee Son
 Sin-Young Pak

Spain 

 Elisabet Lopez Valledor
 Aitziber Elejaga Vargas
 Noelia Oncina Morena
 Nataliya Morskova 
 Marta Mangue Gonzales
 Izaskun Mugica
 Cristina Esmeralda Lopez Quiros
 Maria Teresa Andreu Rodgriuez 
 Cristina Gomez Arquer 
 Ana Isabel Ruiz Perez 
 Diana Box Alonso 
 Tatiana Garmendia 
 Silvia Del Olmo Escudero 
 Montserrat Puche Diaz 
 Susana Pareja Ibarra
 Susana Fraile Celaya

Sweden 

 Madelene Grundström
 Asa Elisabeth Eriksson 
 Katharina Arfwidsson 
 Veronica Isaksson 
 Theresa Claesson 
 Madelene Olsson 
 Asa Lundmark 
 Anna Ljungdahl 
 Kristina Linea Flognman
 Jenny Lindblom
 Jennie Florin
 Linda Nilsson
 Karin Almqvist
 Lina Möller
 Karin Nilsson

Tunisia 

 Nour Ghamman
 Sonia Ghribi 
 Ibtissem Toumi
 Mouna Bin Halima
 Ibitissem Gmessaouda 
 Hela Msaad
 Sinem Aouini
 Raoudha Dridi
 Rym Manai 
 Amira Fekin Romdhane 
 Haifa Abdelhak 
 Rafika Marzouk 
 Mouna Chebbah 
 Raja Toumi

Ukraine 

 Nataliya Borysenko
 Tetyana Vorozhtsova
 Iryna Hontcharova
 Vita Markova
 Tetyana Nykytenko 
 Olena Iatsenko 
 Tetyana Sytnyk 
 Anastasia Borodina
 Oksana Raykhel 
 Olena Reznir 
 Ganna Syukalo 
 Galyna Markushevska 
 Liliya Stolpakova 
 Larya Kharlanyuk
 Olena Radchenko

Uruguay 

 N’Haloy Laicouschi
 Maria Lorena Estefanell
 Daniela Mata 
 Sofia Griot Gayoso 
 Veronica Tessmann
 Fabiana Benvenuto
 Mercedes Amor
 Veronica Castro 
 Jussara Castro
 Silvana Renom 
 Silvana De Armas 
 Yanina Noveri
 Maria Noel Uriarte 
 Mercedes Amor Estrago 
 Mariana Fleitas Riera 
 Jimena Martinez
 Marcela Schelotto Musetti

Yugoslavia 

 Zlata Paplacko
 Tatjana Medved
 Sanja Jovović
 Sandra Kolaković
 Ljiljana Knežević
 Biljana Balać
 Branka Jovanović
 Snežana Damjanac
 Maja Savić
 Aida Selmanović
 Emina Krasnić
 Bojana Petrović
 Milanka Čelebić
 Tanja Milanović
 Olivera Mugoša
 Dragica Miličković

Coach: Milorad Milatović

References 

World Women's Handball Championship squads
World Handball Championship squads